Jafarabad (also  as Ja‘farābād-e ‘Olyā; also known as Ja‘farābād-e Sharqhī) is a village in Sudlaneh Rural District, in the Central District of Quchan County, Razavi Khorasan Province, Iran. At the 2006 census, its population was 632, in 161 families.

References 

Populated places in Quchan County